Diadexia parodes is a moth in the family Crambidae. It was described by Turner in 1905. It is found in Australia.

References

Crambinae
Moths described in 1905